John Heigham (1568? – 1634?) was an English Roman Catholic printer, writer, and translator. He went into exile in Douai and Saint-Omer, where he married and brought up a family. A son John, who took holy orders, left Rome for the English mission in 1649.

Works
His works are now thought to include at least one book published under the name of Matthew Kellison, The Gagge of the Reformed Gospell, from 1623. This was intended as a divisive work aimed at English Protestants, setting the decrees of the Synod of Dort against texts from the King James Bible.

Other works were:

 A Devout Exposition of the Holie Masse. With an Ample Declaration of all the Rites and Ceremonies belonging to the same, Douay, 1614; St. Omer, 1622; and again London, 1876, edited by Austin Joseph Rowley.
 A Mirrour to Confesse well for such persons as doe frequent this Sacrament. Abridged out of sundrie confessionals by a certain devout Religious man, Douay, 1618 and 1624.
 A Method of Meditation, translated from the French of Father Ignatius Balsom, St. Omer, 1618. 
 The Psalter of Jesus, contayninge very devoute and godlie petitions, Douay, 1618. This is a revised edition of Richard Whytford's Psalter. It was reprinted, Douay, 1624, with ‘A Mirrour to Confesse well’ and the four following works, in all six parts, each having a distinct title-page.
 Certaine very pious and godly considerations proper to be exercised whilst the … Sacrifice of the Masse is celebrated, Douay, 1624.
 Divers Devout considerations for the more worthy receaving of the … Sacrament, Douay, 1624.
 Certaine advertisements teaching men how to lead a Christian life, Douay, 1624, translated from the Italian of Charles Borromeo.
 A briefe and profitable exercise of the seaven principall effusions of the … blood of … Jesus Christ, a translation from the French, Douay, 1624.
 Meditations on the Mysteries of our holie Faith, with the Practise of Mental Prayer touching the same, from the Spanish of Luis de la Puente, St. Omer, 1619; reprinted, in a revised and corrected form, London, 1852. This translation is distinct from that of Richard Gibbons in 1610.
 The True Christian Catholique; or the Maner How to Live Christianly, St. Omer, 1622. From the French of the Jesuit Philippe Doultreman (1585–1652).
 Villegas's Lives of the Saints translated, whereunto are added the Lives of sundry other Saints of the Universal Church, set forth by J. Heigham, St. Omer, 1630. The Flos Sanctorum of Alfonso Villegas went to a number of editions in English translation by Edward and William Kinsman, this one being edited by Heigham.
 Via Vere Tuta; or the Truly Safe Way. Discovering the Danger, Crookedness, and Uncertaintie of M. John Preston and Sir Humfrey Lindes Unsafe Way, St. Omer, 1631 and 1639. In answer to Sir Humphrey Lynde's Via Tuta.

Notes

References

1568 births
1634 deaths
17th-century printers
17th-century English translators
16th-century English writers
17th-century English businesspeople
16th-century Roman Catholics
17th-century Roman Catholics
English Roman Catholics
English printers
English translators
English male non-fiction writers